The 2020 Mid-American Conference football season was the 75th season for the Mid-American Conference (MAC), as part of the 2020 NCAA Division I FBS football season.

The provisional schedule was released on February 26, 2020, with a regular season between September 3 and November 28, 2020, and the MAC Championship Game on December 5, 2020. On August 8, 2020, the MAC announced that all fall sports had been postponed due to the COVID-19 pandemic, with plans to attempt play in Spring 2021.  Commissioner Jon Steinbrecher stated that "there are simply too many unknowns to put our student-athletes into situations that are not clearly understood." It was reported that the NIU Huskies — the conference's most successful team — were instrumental in pushing for a full cancellation of the season, and had also suggested the possibility of opting out if the MAC did decide to play. Concerns were also raised over the budgetary impacts of health protocols such as testing, especially with the cancellation of all but five games against Power Five conference opponents (which often serve as a major revenue source) due to restrictions to in-conference play only. The MAC became the first FBS conference to cancel the 2020 season entirely due to COVID-19. On September 24, 2020 The MAC voted unanimously to resume the fall football season. the six-game conference-only schedule will begin on Wednesday, Nov. 4 with a full slate of games.  The regular season will conclude with the East Division & West Division Champions playing in the MAC Championship Game on Friday, Dec. 18 at Ford Field in Detroit, Mich The Conference will implement a COVID-19 testing program requiring four antigen tests per week with all positive tests needing confirmation with a polymerase chain reaction (PCR) test. Any student athlete with a positive test will enter a cardiac screening protocol.  The MAC's approved COVID-19 testing protocols, including four tests per week, will begin Monday, October 5.  On October 7 the MAC released the new 2020 Football schedule.

Previous season
 
In 2019, the Miami RedHawks won the east division, and the Central Michigan Chippewas won the west, both with a 6–2 conference record. In the 2019 MAC Championship Game, the RedHawks defeated the Chippewas 26–21 in overtime. The RedHawks would go on to the 2020 LendingTree Bowl, where they were defeated 27-17 by the Louisiana Ragin' Cajuns.

Head coaches

Coaches

Rankings

Regular Season Schedule

Week 1

Week 2

Week 3

Week 4

Week 5

Week 6

Championship Game

Week 7 (MAC Championship game)

Postseason

Bowl Games

Awards and honors

Player of the week honors

East Division

West Division

MAC Individual Awards
The following individuals received postseason honors as voted by the Mid-American Conference football coaches at the end of the season

All-conference teams

Ref:

All-Americans

The 2020 College Football All-America Teams are composed of the following College Football All-American first teams chosen by the following selector organizations: Associated Press (AP), Football Writers Association of America (FWAA), American Football Coaches Association (AFCA), Walter Camp Foundation (WCFF), The Sporting News (TSN), Sports Illustrated (SI), USA Today (USAT) ESPN, CBS Sports (CBS), FOX Sports (FOX) College Football News (CFN), Bleacher Report (BR), Scout.com, Phil Steele (PS), SB Nation (SB), Athlon Sports, Pro Football Focus (PFF) and Yahoo! Sports (Yahoo!).

Currently, the NCAA compiles consensus all-America teams in the sports of Division I-FBS football and Division I men's basketball using a point system computed from All-America teams named by coaches associations or media sources.  The system consists of three points for a first-team honor, two points for second-team honor, and one point for third-team honor.  Honorable mention and fourth team or lower recognitions are not accorded any points.  Football consensus teams are compiled by position and the player accumulating the most points at each position is named first team consensus all-American.  Currently, the NCAA recognizes All-Americans selected by the AP, AFCA, FWAA, TSN, and the WCFF to determine Consensus and Unanimous All-Americans. Any player named to the First Team by all five of the NCAA-recognized selectors is deemed a Unanimous All-American.

NFL Draft

The following list includes all MAC players drafted in the 2021 NFL Draft

References

Mid-American Conference football season